Shamong Township is a township in Burlington County, in the U.S. state of New Jersey. As of the 2020 United States census, the township's population was 6,460, a decrease of 30 (−0.5%) from the 2010 census count of 6,490, which in turn reflected an increase of 28 (+0.4%) from the 6,462 counted in the 2000 census.

Shamong was incorporated as a township by an act of the New Jersey Legislature on February 19, 1852, from portions of Medford Township, Southampton Township and Washington Township. Portions of the township were taken to form Woodland Township (March 7, 1866) and Tabernacle Township (March 22, 1901). In April 1902, portions of Hammonton and Waterford Township were annexed to the township. The township's name comes from Native American terms meaning "place of the big horn", from the words oschummo ("horn") and onk ("place").

New Jersey Monthly magazine ranked Shamong Township as its 6th best place to live in its 2008 rankings of the "Best Places To Live" in New Jersey.

History
This area and much of present-day southern New Jersey was inhabited by Lenape Native Americans at the time of European encounter. They spoke Unami, one of the three major dialects of Lenape, which was part of the Algonquian language family. The Lenape ranged from the New York metropolitan area and western Long Island, into New Jersey, eastern Pennsylvania along the Delaware River, and Delaware.

By the mid-18th century, English colonists had pushed the local Lenape of southern New Jersey onto what was formerly called the Brotherton Indian Reservation, in the area of present-day Indian Mills, which was named for mills built and operated by the Brotherton people, who were converted Christian Indians. Some were moved in 1765 from Cranbury, New Jersey.  With continuing pressure after the American Revolutionary War, the Brotherton Indians of New Jersey migrated to New York, accepting an offer by the Stockbridge Indians, also Christian converts, to settle on their reservation in the central part of the state, where they had been allocated land by the Oneida people, one of the Iroquois nations. Also migrating there were some of the Munsee-speaking Lenape from the northern part of their territory. These remnant peoples were trying to reorganize after years of disease and conflict with colonists and major powers. The Brotherton Indians sold their last property in New Jersey in 1818 and had essentially been absorbed by the Munsee.

After the Revolutionary War, settlers from New England poured into New York, encroaching on Indian territory. Finally, the Stockbridge and Munsee relocated to Wisconsin in the 1820s and 1830s, pushed out with the Oneida by the United States Indian Removal policy to relocate Native Americans to the west of the Mississippi River. Today the Stockbridge-Munsee Community is a federally recognized tribe, with a  reservation in Shawano County, Wisconsin.

A 1992, non-binding referendum gave voters the opportunity to consider renaming the township to Indian Mills, the name of an unincorporated community in the township.

Geography
According to the U.S. Census Bureau, the township had a total area of 45.01 square miles (116.58 km2), including 44.45 square miles (115.14 km2) of land and 0.56 square miles (1.44 km2) of water (1.24%). Unincorporated communities, localities and place names located partially or completely within the township include Atsion, Dellette, Flyat, Hampton Furnace, High Crossing, Indian Mills, and Smalls.

The township borders Medford Township, Tabernacle Township, and Washington Township in Burlington County; Hammonton in Atlantic County; and Waterford Township in Camden County.

The township is one of 56 South Jersey municipalities that are included within the New Jersey Pinelands National Reserve, a protected natural area of unique ecology covering , that has been classified as a United States Biosphere Reserve and established by Congress in 1978 as the nation's first National Reserve. All of the township is included in the state-designated Pinelands Area, which includes portions of Burlington County, along with areas in Atlantic, Camden, Cape May, Cumberland, Gloucester and Ocean counties.

Demographics

2010 census

The Census Bureau's 2006–2010 American Community Survey showed that (in 2010 inflation-adjusted dollars) median household income was $104,063 (with a margin of error of +/− $7,752) and the median family income was $110,848 (+/− $10,655). Males had a median income of $80,188 (+/− $22,205) versus $53,591 (+/− $14,752) for females. The per capita income for the borough was $38,817 (+/− $3,645). About 2.4% of families and 3.8% of the population were below the poverty line, including 1.6% of those under age 18 and 9.4% of those age 65 or over.

2000 census
As of the 2000 U.S. census, there were 6,462 people, 2,132 households, and 1,820 families residing in the township. The racial makeup of the township was 97.25% White, 0.82% African American, 0.11% Native American, 0.67% Asian, 0.31% from other races, and 0.85% from two or more races. Hispanic or Latino of any race were 1.05% of the population.

There were 2,132 households, out of which 44.9% had children under the age of 18 living with them, 76.2% were married couples living together, 6.0% had a female householder with no husband present, and 14.6% were non-families. 11.4% of all households were made up of individuals, and 3.8% had someone living alone who was 65 years of age or older.  The average household size was 3.03 and the average family size was 3.29.

In the township, the population was spread out, with 29.4% under the age of 18, 6.5% from 18 to 24, 28.9% from 25 to 44, 29.2% from 45 to 64, and 6.0% who were 65 years of age or older. The median age was 37 years. For every 100 females, there were 100.5 males.  For every 100 females age 18 and over, there were 99.8 males.

The median income for a household in the township was $77,457, and the median income for a family was $82,534. Males had a median income of $55,664 versus $35,440 for females. The per capita income for the township was $30,934.  About 2.3% of families and 2.6% of the population were below the poverty line, including 3.7% of those under age 18 and 2.1% of those age 65 or over.

Government

Local government

Shamong Township is governed under the Township form of New Jersey municipal government, one of 141 municipalities (of the 564) statewide that use this form, the second-most commonly used form of government in the state. The Township Committee is comprised of five members, who are elected directly by the voters at-large in partisan elections to serve three-year terms of office on a staggered basis, with either one or two seats coming up for election each year as part of the November general election in a three-year cycle. At an annual reorganization meeting held each January, the Township Committee selects one of its members to serve as Mayor and another as Deputy Mayor.

, members of the Shamong Township Committee are Mayor Timothy L. Gimbel (R, term on committee and as mayor ends December 31, 2022), Deputy Mayor Michael S. DiCroce (R, term on committee and as deputy mayor ends 2022), Michael P. Cooney (R, 2021), Sean Gray (R, 2021) and Martin D. Mozitis (R, 2023), Brian Woods (2024) and Chris Zehnder (2024).

Township Committee member Chris Norman left office in January 2012, citing potential conflicts of interest in his employment with a law firm that does business with the township and was replaced by Tim Gimbel on an interim basis before Gimbel won election in November 2012 to serve the balance of Norman's term ending December 2013.<ref>Tait, Adam III. "Shamong swears new committeeman", ""Journal Register News, February 21, 2012. Accessed December 1, 2013. "Tim Gimbel was sworn in as the township's newest committeeman at the group's last meeting. Gimbel was chosen from among three candidates for the all-Republican board, with the oath of office administered by Solicitor Douglas Heinold."</ref>

Emergency services
Law enforcement in the township is provided from the New Jersey State Police barracks in Southampton Township.

 Federal, state, and county representation 
Shamong Township is located in the 3rd Congressional District and is part of New Jersey's 8th state legislative district.2019 New Jersey Citizen's Guide to Government, New Jersey League of Women Voters. Accessed October 30, 2019.

 

Burlington County is governed by a Board of County Commissioners comprised of five members who are chosen at-large in partisan elections to serve three-year terms of office on a staggered basis, with either one or two seats coming up for election each year; at an annual reorganization meeting, the board selects a director and deputy director from among its members to serve a one-year term. , Burlington County's Commissioners are
Director Felicia Hopson (D, Willingboro Township, term as commissioner ends December 31, 2024; term as director ends 2023),
Deputy Director Tom Pullion (D, Edgewater Park, term as commissioner and as deputy director ends 2023),
Allison Eckel (D, Medford, 2025),
Daniel J. O'Connell (D, Delran Township, 2024) and 
Balvir Singh (D, Burlington Township, 2023).November 8, 2022 Summary Report Burlington County Official Results, Burlington County, New Jersey, updated November 29, 2022. Accessed January 1, 2023.November 3, 2020 Summary Report Burlington County Official Results, Burlington County, New Jersey, updated November 23, 2020. Accessed January 1, 2021. 
Burlington County's Constitutional Officers are
County Clerk Joanne Schwartz (R, Southampton Township, 2023)Members List: Clerks, Constitutional Officers Association of New Jersey. Accessed February 1, 2023.
Sheriff James H. Kostoplis (D, Bordentown, 2025)Members List: Sheriffs, Constitutional Officers Association of New Jersey. Accessed February 1, 2023. and 
Surrogate Brian J. Carlin (D, Burlington Township, 2026).Members List: Surrogates, Constitutional Officers Association of New Jersey. Accessed February 1, 2023.

Politics
As of March 2011, there were a total of 4,549 registered voters in Shamong Township, of which 830 (18.2% vs. 33.3% countywide) were registered as Democrats, 1,584 (34.8% vs. 23.9%) were registered as Republicans and 2,132 (46.9% vs. 42.8%) were registered as Unaffiliated. There were 3 voters registered as Libertarians or Greens. Among the township's 2010 Census population, 70.1% (vs. 61.7% in Burlington County) were registered to vote, including 95.8% of those ages 18 and over (vs. 80.3% countywide).GCT-P7: Selected Age Groups: 2010 - State -- County Subdivision; 2010 Census Summary File 1 for New Jersey , United States Census Bureau. Accessed December 28, 2014.

In the 2012 presidential election, Republican Mitt Romney received 2,084 votes here (59.9% vs. 40.2% countywide), ahead of Democrat Barack Obama with 1,348 votes (38.7% vs. 58.1%) and other candidates with 40 votes (1.1% vs. 1.0%), among the 3,480 ballots cast by the township's 4,710 registered voters, for a turnout of 73.9% (vs. 74.5% in Burlington County).Number of Registered Voters and Ballots Cast November 6, 2012 General Election Results - Burlington County , New Jersey Department of State Division of Elections, March 15, 2013. Accessed December 28, 2014. In the 2008 presidential election, Republican John McCain received 2,073 votes here (56.8% vs. 39.9% countywide), ahead of Democrat Barack Obama with 1,510 votes (41.4% vs. 58.4%) and other candidates with 44 votes (1.2% vs. 1.0%), among the 3,648 ballots cast by the township's 4,564 registered voters, for a turnout of 79.9% (vs. 80.0% in Burlington County). In the 2004 presidential election, Republican George W. Bush received 2,188 votes here (62.4% vs. 46.0% countywide), ahead of Democrat John Kerry with 1,286 votes (36.7% vs. 52.9%) and other candidates with 22 votes (0.6% vs. 0.8%), among the 3,507 ballots cast by the township's 4,452 registered voters, for a turnout of 78.8% (vs. 78.8% in the whole county).

In the 2013 gubernatorial election, Republican Chris Christie received 1,474 votes here (76.1% vs. 61.4% countywide), ahead of Democrat Barbara Buono with 409 votes (21.1% vs. 35.8%) and other candidates with 24 votes (1.2% vs. 1.2%), among the 1,937 ballots cast by the township's 4,679 registered voters, yielding a 41.4% turnout (vs. 44.5% in the county).Number of Registered Voters and Ballots Cast November 5, 2013 General Election Results : Burlington County, New Jersey Department of State Division of Elections, January 29, 2014. Accessed December 28, 2014. In the 2009 gubernatorial election, Republican Chris Christie received 1,586 votes here (66.2% vs. 47.7% countywide), ahead of Democrat Jon Corzine with 634 votes (26.5% vs. 44.5%), Independent Chris Daggett with 128 votes (5.3% vs. 4.8%) and other candidates with 23 votes (1.0% vs. 1.2%), among the 2,394 ballots cast by the township's 4,542 registered voters, yielding a 52.7% turnout (vs. 44.9% in the county).

Education
The Shamong Township School District serves public school students in kindergarten through eighth grade. As of the 2018–19 school year, the district, comprised of two schools, had an enrollment of 746 students and 64.5 classroom teachers (on an FTE basis), for a student–teacher ratio of 11.6:1. Schools in the district (with 2018–19 enrollment data from the National Center for Education Statistics) are 
Indian Mills Elementary School with 394 students in grades PreK–4 and 
Indian Mills Memorial Middle School with 348 students in grades 5–8.2018-2019 Burlington County Public Schools Directory, Burlington County, New Jersey. Accessed May 14, 2020.

Public school students in Shamong Township in ninth through twelfth grades attend Seneca High School located in Tabernacle Township, which also serves students from Southampton Township, Tabernacle Township and Woodland Township. The school is part of the Lenape Regional High School District, which also serves students from Evesham Township, Medford Lakes, Medford Township and Mount Laurel Township.Staff. "Regional School Districts", Burlington County Times, April 26, 2015. Accessed March 6, 2020. "Lenape Regional Serves: Evesham, Medford, Medford Lakes, Mount Laurel, Shamong, Southampton, Tabernacle, Woodland" As of the 2018–2019 school year, the high school had an enrollment of 1,137 students and 109.5 classroom teachers (on an FTE basis), for a student–teacher ratio of 10.4:1.

Students from Shamong Township, and from all of Burlington County, are eligible to attend the Burlington County Institute of Technology, a countywide public school district that serves the vocational and technical education needs of students at the high school and post-secondary level at its campuses in Medford and Westampton Township.

Transportation

U.S. Route 206 is the most significant highway passing through Shamong Township. County Route 534 and County Route 541 also serve the township.

Wineries
 Valenzano Winery

Notable people

People who were born in, residents of, or otherwise closely associated with Shamong Township include:
 Daria Berenato (born 1993), wrestler, currently signed to WWE under the Smackdown brand as Sonya Deville
 Kacey Carrig (born 1992), model
 Kevin Comer (born 1992), professional baseball pitcher for the Detroit Tigers organization
 John J. Gardner (1845–1921), Mayor of Atlantic City, New Jersey who represented  from 1893 to 1913
 Keith Jones (born 1968), former forward for the Philadelphia Flyers
 Juliet Richardson (born 1980), singer, known as Juliet, best known for her 2005 album Random Order'' and hit single "Avalon"
 William Still (1821–1902), abolitionist
 Joe Vento (1939–2011), owner of South Philadelphia cheesesteak shop Geno's Steaks

References

External links

Official Shamong Township website

 
1852 establishments in New Jersey
Populated places in the Pine Barrens (New Jersey)
Populated places established in 1852
Township form of New Jersey government
Townships in Burlington County, New Jersey